The Critical Benchmarks (References and Administrators' Liability) Act 2021 is an Act of Parliament proposed by Theodore Agnew as Minister of State for Efficiency and Transformation regarding how critical benchmarks should be treated in contracts and the liability of administrators when operating under Financial Services Authority guidelines.

References 

2021 in British law
United Kingdom Acts of Parliament 2021
Financial regulation in the United Kingdom
United Kingdom contract law